Park Yun-ha (Hangul: 박윤하, (also known as Park Yoon-ha) (born April 17, 1999) is a South Korean singer signed under Jellyfish Entertainment. She is known for reaching the TOP 6 in the fourth season of the South Korean reality television competition show K-pop Star.

Career

2014–present: K-pop Star 4 and collaborations
In 2014 Park Yoon-ha successfully auditioned for  the fourth season of the South Korean reality television competition show K-pop Star, which aired from November 23, 2014 to April 19, 2015 on SBS. After several rounds and stage performances on the show, Park was eliminated on March 22, 2015.

In May, Park was featured in Kim Sung-kyu's single "Reply" from his second solo album 27, the single charted at 29 on the Gaon Music Chart.

In July 2015, Park signed an exclusive contract with Jellyfish Entertainment. On July 20, the agency announced the good news, revealing, "Park Yoon Ha has signed an exclusive contract with us. Despite Park Yoon Ha's young age, she has a clear and delicate voice and potential musical talents. In the future, we will provide her full support to help Park Yoon Ha improve her skills in respect to her colors and music direction and will help her grow into a great artist, combining her playing skills and singing."

On December 15, 2015 Jellyfish Entertainment released their Jelly Christmas 2015 – 4랑 single album featuring the song, "Love in the Air". The announced participating the Jellyfish artists were Park Yoon-ha, Seo in Guk, VIXX and former Jewelry member Park JungA. The single charted at number 14 on the digital Gaon Chart.

On June 8, 2016, Park participated in Jellyfish Entertainment's new music channel project Jelly Box and released the single "Summer Night's Picnic" with Yoo Seung-woo.

Park participated in Jellyfish Entertainment's winter project, Jelly Christmas 2016, with her label mates Seo In-guk, VIXX, Gugudan, Park Jung-ah, Kim Gyu-sun, Kim Ye-won and Jiyul. The title track, "Falling" was released digitally on December 13, 2016.

Discography

Singles

Filmography

Variety shows

References

External links
 Park Yoon-ha at Jellyfish Entertainment

Jellyfish Entertainment artists
1999 births
K-pop singers
Living people
South Korean women pop singers
South Korean female idols
K-pop Star participants
21st-century South Korean singers
21st-century South Korean women singers